The 1943 VFL Lightning Premiership was an Australian rules football knockout competition played entirely on Saturday 24, July. It was played during a week's break of the Victorian Football Leagues's 1943 VFL season between rounds 11 and 12, with all games being played at Princes Park. The competition was played as a wartime charities fundraiser between the league's top four clubs. This was the third time a lightning premiership had been contested in the VFL. Approximately 11,000 people attended the three match competition. Essendon won the competition by 8 points, defeating Fitzroy in the final.

Matches

Semi finals

|- bgcolor="#CCCCFF"
| Home team
| Home team score
| Away team
| Away team score
| Ground
| Date
|- bgcolor="#FFFFFF"
| Fitzroy
| 5.4 (34)
| Hawthorn
| 3.6 (24)
| Princes Park
| Saturday, 24 July
|- bgcolor="#FFFFFF"
| Essendon
| 2.6 (18)
| Richmond
| 1.2 (8)
| Princes Park
| Saturday, 24 July

Grand final

|- bgcolor="#CCCCFF"
| Home team
| Home team score
| Away team
| Away team score
| Ground
| Date
|- bgcolor="#FFFFFF"
| Fitzroy
| 3.3 (21)
| Essendon
| 4.5 (29)
| Princes Park
| Saturday, 24 July

See also
List of Australian Football League night premiers
Australian Football League pre-season competition
1943 VFL season

Australian Football League pre-season competition
Vfl Lightning Premiership, 1943